Zhong Shijian (born May 1956) is a former Chinese politician who spent most of his career in South China's Guangdong province. As of April 2015 he was under investigation by the Communist Party's anti-corruption agency. Previously he served as Deputy Secretary of the Guangdong Provincial Discipline Inspection Commission, Head of Guangdong Supervision Department, and Director of Guangdong Provincial Corruption Prevention Bureau.

Life and career
Zhong was born and raised in Dianbai District of Maoming city, in Guangdong province. In January 1980 he graduated from Hainan Normal University, majoring in biology.

He served in various administrative and political roles in Zhuhai before serving as Deputy Communist Party Secretary in January 2004. He concurrently served as Mayor of Zhuhai in January 2007.

In January 2012, he was appointed Deputy Secretary of the Guangdong Provincial Discipline Inspection Commission, at the same time as holding the posts of Head of Guangdong Supervision Department, and Director of Guangdong Provincial Corruption Prevention Bureau between April 2013 to April 2015.

He was a delete of the 11th National People's Congress.

Downfall
On April 1, 2015, the state media reported that he was placed under investigation by the Communist Party's anti-corruption agency. On July 21, he was expelled from the Communist Party of China (CPC).

In 2016, he was sentenced to 15 years and 6 months and fined 3.5 million yuan for taking bribes by the Xiamen Intermediate People's Court.

Chinese media Caixin reported that he had close relations with Zhu Mingguo, former chairman of the Guangdong Provincial Committee of the Chinese People’s Political Consultative Conference.

References

 

 

 

 

1956 births
People's Republic of China politicians from Guangdong
Living people
Political office-holders in Guangdong
Hainan Normal University alumni
Chinese Communist Party politicians from Guangdong
Politicians from Maoming